Bathurst County, an electoral district of the Legislative Assembly in the Australian state of New South Wales was created in 1856 and abolished in 1859.


Election results

1858

1856 by-election
Having been elected to two seats, John Plunkett chose to resign from Bathurst County in May 1856.

1856

References 

New South Wales state electoral results by district